Anastasia Sivolobova (born 14 August 1998) is a Moldovan footballer who plays as a defender for Portuguese Campeonato Nacional Feminino club GDC A-dos-Francos and the Moldova women's national team.

Career
Sivolobova has been capped for the Moldova national team, appearing for the team during the 2019 FIFA Women's World Cup qualifying cycle.

See also
List of Moldova women's international footballers

References

External links
 
 
 

1998 births
Living people
Moldovan women's footballers
Women's association football defenders
Campeonato Nacional de Futebol Feminino players
Moldova women's international footballers
Moldovan expatriate women's footballers
Moldovan expatriate sportspeople in Portugal
Expatriate women's footballers in Portugal